Sardar Hukma Singh was the Governor of Attock and Hazara in the Sikh Empire from 1818 to 1820. He was a Khatri of Gandi sub-caste of Kashyapa Gotra. He was born to Ram Singh, a soldier in the Sukerchakia Misl. Ram Singh was killed at Bhula Kariala in a skirmish, and left one son, Hukma Singh, a minor. Hukma Singh joined the Khalsa Army when able to bear arms and distinguished himself in the Battle of Kasur in 1807, in which he was severely wounded. He was created a Chief (Sardar) at the same time as Hari Singh Nalwa and received charge of the Ramnagar District and military command of the contingents of the Darap Jagirdars. He fought with the Lahore Chiefs in Pathankot and Sialkot, earning approval from Maharaja Ranjit Singh.

For his contribution in the battle, Hukma Singh received Jagirs worth Rs. 60,000 in Ugoki and Roras, and additional Jagirs worth Rs. 40,000 in Sayadgarh, and also a portion of the Sialkot Jagir, which he held for 7 years. In 1814, Yar Mahomed, with the aid of the people of Khairabad, drove the Sikhs out of Attock. Hukma Singh, with Sham Singh Bhandari and two thousand troops, attacked him and drove him across the Indus, recovering the plunder which the Afghan Army had collected. Khairabad was severely punished for its treason in the affair.

In 1818, he was appointed the Governor of the Districts of Attock and Hazara, and he named Bhai Makhan Singh as his deputy.

References 

Year of birth missing
Place of birth missing
People of the Sikh Empire